Karu, one of several languages called Baniwa (Baniva), or in older sources Itayaine (Iyaine), is an Arawakan language spoken in Guainía, Colombia, Venezuela, and Amazonas, Brazil. It forms a subgroup with the Tariana, Piapoco, Resígaro and Guarequena languages. There are 10,000 speakers.

Varieties
Aikhenvald (1999) considers the three main varieties to be dialects; Kaufman (1994) considers them to be distinct languages, in a group he calls "Karu". They are:
Baniwa of Içana (Baniua do Içana)
Curripaco (Kurripako, Ipeka-Tapuia-Curripako)
Katapolítani-Moriwene-Mapanai (Catapolitani, Kadaupuritana)

Various  of all three are called tapuya, a Brazilian Portuguese and Nheengatu word for non-Tupi/non-Guarani Indigenous peoples of Brazil (from a Tupi word meaning "enemy, barbarian"). All are spoken by the Baniwa people.  Ruhlen lists all as "Izaneni"; Greenberg's Adzánani (= Izaneni) presumably belongs here.

Ramirez (2020) gives the following classification for three separate dialect chains:

Southern (Karotana): lower Içana River, also a group living in Victorino on the Guainia River (Colombia-Venezuela border)
Mapatsi-Dákeenai (Yurupari-Tapuya)
Wadzoli-Dákeenai (Urubu-Tapuya)
Dzawi-Mínanai (Yauareté-Tapuya)
Adaro-Mínanai (Arara-Tapuya)
Central (Baniwa): middle Içana River (from Assunção Mission to Siuci-Cachoeira) and its tributaries (Aiari River and lower Cuiari River); also around Tunuí
Hohódeeni
Walipere-Dákeenai (Siucí-Tapuya)
Máolieni (Cáuatapuya)
Mápanai (Ira-Tapuya)
Awádzoronai
Molíweni (Sucuriyú-Tapuya)
Kadáopoliri
etc.
Northern (called "Koripako" in Brazil): upper Içana River (from Matapi upwards), Guainia River, headwaters of the Cuiari River
Ayáneeni (Tatú-Tapuya)
Payoálieni (Pacútapuya)
Komada-Mínanai (Ipéca-Tapuya)
Kapitti-Mínanai (Coatí-Tapuya)
etc.

Phonology & Grammar

Sounds 

 Voiced approximant sounds can fluctuate to voiceless sounds among dialects.
 /ŋ/ only occurs when preceding a velar consonant.

 When occurring as short, the vowels /i e a o/ are realized as [ɪ ɛ ə ʊ]. They are also realized as both short and long nasals /ĩ ẽ ɐ̃ õ/, [ɪ̃ ɛ̃ ə̃ ʊ̃].

Alignment System 
Baniwa has active–stative alignment. This means that the subject of an intransitive clause is sometimes marked in the same way as the agent of a transitive clause, and sometimes marked in the same way as the patient of a transitive clause. In Baniwa alignment is realized through verbal agreement, namely prefixes and enclitics.

Prefixes are used to mark:
 Active intransitive subjects (Sa)
 Agents of transitive clauses (A)
 Possessors
 Arguments of adpositions
Enclitics are used to mark:
 Stative intransitive subjects (So)
 Patients of transitive clauses (O)

The differences between active and stative intransitive clauses can be illustrated below:
 Transitive: ri-kapa-ni 'He sees him/it'
 Active Intransitive: ri-emhani 'He walks'
 Stative Intransitive: hape-ka-ni 'He is cold'

Noun Classification System 
Baniwa has an interesting system of noun classification that combines a gender system with a noun classifier system. Baniwa has two genders: feminine and nonfeminine. Feminine gender agreement is used to refer to female referents, whilst nonfeminine gender agreement is used for all other referents. The two genders are only distinguished in third person singular. Aihkenvald (2007) considers the bipartite gender system to be inherited from Proto-Arawak.

In addition to gender, Baniwa also has 46 classifiers. Classifiers are used in three main contexts:
 As a derivational suffix on nouns, e.g.

 With numerals, e.g.

 With adjectives, e.g.

Aihkenvald (2007) divides Baniwa classifiers into four different classes. One set of classifiers is used for humans, animate beings and body parts. Another set of classifiers specify the shape, consistency, quantification or specificity of the noun. Two more classes can be distinguished. One is only used with numerals and the other is only used with adjectives.

Classifiers for Humans and animate beings:

Classifiers according to shape, consistency, quantification and specificity:
{| class="wikitable"
!Classifier
!Usage
!Example
|-
|-da
|round objects, natural phenomena and generic classifier
|hipada 'stone'
|-
|-apa
|flying animate, semioval objects
|kepiʒeni 'bird'
|-
|-kwa
|flat, round, extended objects
|kaida 'beach'
|-
|-kha
|curvilinear objects
|a:pi 'snake'
|-
|-na
|vertical, standing objects
|haiku 'tree'
|-
|-Ø
|hollow, small objects
|a:ta 'cup'
|-
|-maka
|stretchable, extended objects
|tsaia 'skirt'
|-
|-ahna
|liquids
|u:ni 'water'
|-
|-ima
|sides
|apema nu-kapi makemaɾi 'one big side of my hand'
|-
|-pa
|boxes, parcels
|apa-pa itsa maka-paɾi one big box of fishing hooks'
|-
|-wana
|thin slice
|apa-wana kuphe maka-wane 'a big thin slice of fish'
|-
|-wata
|bundle for carrying
|apa-wata paɾana maka-wate 'a big bundle of bananas'
|-
|-Ø
|canoes
|i:ta 'canoe'
|-
|-pawa
|rivers
|u:ni 'river'
|-
|-ʃa
|excrement
|iʃa 'excrement'
|-
|-ya
|skins
|dzawiya 'jaguar skin'
|}

 Negation 
There are two main strategies for negation in the Kurripako-Baniwa varieties:
 Independent negative markers
 The privative derivational prefix ma-
Different varieties have different negative markers. This is so prominent that speakers identify Kurripako dialects according to the words for 'yes' and 'no'. 

The independent negative markers come before the verb. They are used as clausal negators in declarative and interrogative sentences. They are also used to link clauses.

The privative suffix is attached to nouns to derive a verb which means 'lacking' the noun from which it was derived. The opposite of the privative prefix is the attributive prefix ka-. This derives a verb which means 'having' the noun from which it was derived. The difference can be illustrated below:
 Noun: iipe 'meat'
 Privative: ma-iipe > meepe 'be thin' (lit. lack meat)
 Attributive: ka-iipe > keepe 'be fat' (lit. have meat)
The prefix is used in combination with the restrictive suffix -tsa to form negative imperatives, e.g. ma-ihnia-tsa''' 'don't eat!'. A privative prefix is also reconstructed in Proto-Arawak privative as *ma-. Word Order 
Granadillo (2014) considers Kurripako a VOS language.

 Vocabulary 

Further reading
Gonçalves, Artur Garcia. 2018. Para uma dialetologia baniwa-koripako do rio Içana''. M.A. dissertation, Universidade de Brasília.

References

External links 

Baniva del Guainia Language
Baniwa of the Aiary and Içana Collection of Robin M. Wright at the Archive of the Indigenous Languages of Latin America. 
Curripaco Collection of Jonathan Hill at the Archive of the Indigenous Languages of Latin America.

Arawakan languages
Languages of Venezuela
Languages of Colombia
Languages of Brazil
Verb–object–subject languages
Indigenous languages of Northern Amazonia